Blaženko Lacković (born 25 December 1980) is a retired Croatian handball player.

He is World champion from 2003, and Olympic champion from 2004 with the Croatia national team. He received silver medals at the 2005 and 2009 World championships, silver medals at the 2008 and 2010 European championships and bronze medals at the 2012 Summer Olympics, the 2012 European Championship and the 2013 World Championship.

Clubs
Lacković has played for the Croatian clubs RK Varteks di Caprio, Metković and RK Zagreb. He was a member of German club SG Flensburg-Handewitt, which reached the EHF Champions League final in 2007.  He eventually won the title with HSV Hamburg during the 2012–13 season. After six years in Hamburg Lacković signed for Macedonian side RK Vardar Skopje in the summer of 2014.On February 3, 2016 Lackovic signed for German club THW Kiel. In Kiel he plays with his teammates in national team Domagoj Duvnjak and Ilija Brozovic.

Honours
Zagreb
Croatian First League (3): 2001-02, 2002–03, 2003–04
Croatian Cup (3): 2002, 2003, 2004

Flensburg
DHB-Pokal (1): 2005
EHF Champions League Finalist (1): 2006-07

HSV
Bundesliga  (1): 2010-11
DHB-Pokal (1): 2010
Super Cup (2): 2009, 2010
EHF Champions League (1): 2012-13

Vardar
Macedonian Super League (2): 2014-15, 2015–16
Macedonian Cup (2): 2015, 2016
SEHA League (1): 2015-16

Kiel
DHB-Pokal (1): 2017

Individual
Franjo Bučar State Award for Sport - 2004
3rd top assist at 2006 European Championship
Best left back at 2009 World Championship

Orders
Order of Danica Hrvatska with face of Franjo Bučar

References

External links
 
 
 
 

1980 births
Living people
People from Novi Marof
Croatian male handball players
Olympic handball players of Croatia
Handball players at the 2004 Summer Olympics
Handball players at the 2008 Summer Olympics
Handball players at the 2012 Summer Olympics
Olympic gold medalists for Croatia
Olympic bronze medalists for Croatia
RK Zagreb players
Olympic medalists in handball
Medalists at the 2012 Summer Olympics
Medalists at the 2004 Summer Olympics
Mediterranean Games gold medalists for Croatia
Competitors at the 2001 Mediterranean Games
RK Vardar players
Mediterranean Games medalists in handball
Croatian expatriate sportspeople in Germany